1000 or one thousand is the natural number following 999 and preceding 1001. In most English-speaking countries, it can be written with or without a comma or sometimes a period separating the thousands digit: 1,000.

A group of one thousand things is sometimes known, from Ancient Greek, as a chiliad. A period of one thousand years may be known as a chiliad or, more often from Latin, as a millennium.

The number 1000 is also sometimes described as a short thousand in medieval contexts where it is necessary to distinguish the Germanic concept of 1200 as a long thousand.

Notation 

 The decimal representation for one thousand is
 1000—a one followed by three zeros, in the general notation ;
 1 × 103—in engineering notation, which for this number coincides with :
 1 × 103 exactly—in scientific normalized exponential notation ;
 1 E+3 exactly—in scientific E notation.
 The SI prefix for a thousand units is "kilo-", abbreviated to "k"—for instance, a kilogram or "kg" is a thousand grams. This is sometimes extended to non-SI contexts, such as "ka" (kiloannum) being used as a shorthand for periods of 1000 years. In computer science, however, "kilo-" is used more loosely to mean 2 to the 10th power (1024).
 In the SI writing style, a non-breaking space can be used as a thousands separator, i.e., to separate the digits of a number at every power of 1000.
 Multiples of thousands are occasionally represented by replacing their last three zeros with the letter "K" or "k": for instance, writing "$30k" for $30 000 or denoting the Y2K computer bug of the year 2000.
 A thousand units of currency, especially dollars or pounds, are colloquially called a grand. In the United States of America this is sometimes abbreviated with a "G" suffix.

Properties 
There are 168 prime numbers less than 1000. 

1000 is the 10th icositetragonal number, or 24-gonal number.

1000 has a reduced totient value of 100, and totient of 400. It is equal to the sum of Euler's totient function over the first 57 integers, with 11 integers having a totient value of 1000.

1000 is the smallest number that generates three primes in the fastest way possible by concatenation of decremented numbers: (1,000,999), (1,000,999,998,997), and (1,000,999,998,997,996,995,994,993) are all prime.

The 1000th prime number is 7919. It is a difference of 1 from the order of the smallest sporadic group:  = 7920.

Selected numbers in the range 1001–1999

1001 to 1099 

1001 = sphenic number (7 × 11 × 13), pentagonal number, pentatope number
1002 = sphenic number, Mertens function zero, abundant number, number of partitions of 22
 1003 = the product of some prime p and the pth prime, namely p = 17.
1004 = heptanacci number
1005 = Mertens function zero, decagonal pyramidal number
1006 = semiprime, product of two distinct isolated primes (2 and 503); unusual number; square-free number; number of compositions (ordered partitions) of 22 into squares; sum of two distinct pentatope numbers (5 and 1001); number of undirected Hamiltonian paths in 4 by 5 square grid graph; record gap between twin primes; number that is the sum of 7 positive 5th powers. In decimal: equidigital number; when turned around, the number looks like a prime, 9001; its cube can be concatenated from other cubes, 1_0_1_8_1_0_8_216 ("_" indicates concatenation, 0 = 03, 1 = 13, 8 = 23, 216 = 63)
1007 = number that is the sum of 8 positive 5th powers
1008 = divisible by the number of primes below it
1009 = smallest four-digit prime, palindromic in bases 11, 15, 19, 24 and 28: (83811, 47415, 2F219, 1I124, 18128). It is also a Lucky prime and Chen prime.
1010 = 103 + 10, Mertens function zero
1011 = the largest n such that 2n contains 101 and doesn't contain 11011, Harshad number in bases 5, 10, 15, 20, 25, 30, 35, 40, 45, 50, 55, 60, 65, 70, 75 (and 202 other bases), number of partitions of 1 into reciprocals of positive integers <= 16 Egyptian fraction
1012 = ternary number, (3210) quadruple triangular number (triangular number is 253), number of partitions of 1 into reciprocals of positive integers <= 17 Egyptian fraction
1013 = Sophie Germain prime, centered square number, Mertens function zero
1014 = 210-10, Mertens function zero, sum of the nontriangular numbers between successive triangular numbers
1015 = square pyramidal number
1016 = member of the Mian–Chowla sequence, stella octangula number, number of surface points on a cube with edge-length 14
1017 = generalized triacontagonal number
1018 = Mertens function zero, 101816 + 1 is prime
1019 = Sophie Germain prime, safe prime, Chen prime
1020 = polydivisible number
1021 = twin prime with 1019. It is also a Lucky prime.
1022 = Friedman number
1023 = sum of five consecutive primes (193 + 197 + 199 + 211 + 223); the number of three-dimensional polycubes with 7 cells; number of elements in a 9-simplex; highest number one can count to on one's fingers using binary; magic number used in Global Positioning System signals.
1024 = 322 = 45 = 210, the number of bytes in a kilobyte (in 1999, the IEC coined kibibyte to use for 1024 with kilobyte being 1000, but this convention has not been widely adopted). 1024 is the smallest 4-digit square and also a Friedman number.
1025 = Proth number 210 + 1; member of Moser–de Bruijn sequence, because its base-4 representation (1000014) contains only digits 0 and 1, or it's a sum of distinct powers of 4 (45 + 40); Jacobsthal-Lucas number; hypotenuse of primitive Pythagorean triangle
1026 = sum of two distinct powers of 2 (1024 + 2)
1027 = sum of the squares of the first eight primes; can be written from base 2 to base 18 using only the digits 0 to 9.
1028 = sum of totient function for first 58 integers; can be written from base 2 to base 18 using only the digits 0 to 9; number of primes <= 213.
1029 = can be written from base 2 to base 18 using only the digits 0 to 9.
1030 = generalized heptagonal number
1031 = exponent and number of ones for the fifth base-10 repunit prime, Sophie Germain prime, super-prime, Chen prime
1032 = sum of two distinct powers of 2 (1024 + 8)
1033 = emirp, twin prime with 1031
1034 = sum of 12 positive 9th powers
1035 = triangular number, hexagonal number
1036 = central polygonal number
1037 = number in E-toothpick sequence
1038 = even integer that is an unordered sum of two primes in exactly n ways
1039 = prime of the form 8n+7, number of partitions of 30 that do not contain 1 as a part, Chen prime
1040 = 45 + 42: sum of distinct powers of 4
1041 = sum of 11 positive 5th powers
1042 = sum of 12 positive 5th powers
1043 = number whose sum of even digits and sum of odd digits are even
1044 = sum of distinct powers of 4
1045 = octagonal number
1046 = coefficient of f(q) (3rd order mock theta function)
1047 = number of ways to split a strict composition of n into contiguous subsequences that have the same sum
1048 = number of partitions of n into squarefree parts
1049 = Sophie Germain prime, highly cototient number, Chen prime
1050 = 10508 to decimal becomes a pronic number (55210), number of parts in all partitions of 29 into distinct parts
1051 = centered pentagonal number, centered decagonal number
1052 = number that is the sum of 9 positive 6th powers
1053 = triangular matchstick number
1054 = centered triangular number
1055 = number that is the sum of 12 positive 6th powers
1056 = pronic number
1057 = central polygonal number
1058 = number that is the sum of 4 positive 5th powers, area of a square with diagonal 46
1059 = number n such that n4 is written in the form of a sum of four positive 4th powers
1060 = sum of the first 25 primes
1061 = emirp, twin prime with 1063
1062 = number that is not the sum of two palindromes
1063 = super-prime, sum of seven consecutive primes (137 + 139 + 149 + 151 + 157 + 163 + 167); near-wall-sun-sun prime
1064 = sum of two positive cubes
1065 = generalized duodecagonal
1066 = number whose sum of their divisors is a square
1067 = number of strict integer partitions of n in which are empty or have smallest part not dividing the other ones
1068 = number that is the sum of 7 positive 5th powers, total number of parts in all partitions of 15
1069 = emirp
1070 = number that is the sum of 9 positive 5th powers
1071 = heptagonal number
1072 = centered heptagonal number
1073 = number that is the sum of 12 positive 5th powers
1074 = number that is not the sum of two palindromes
1075 = number non-sum of two palindromes
1076 = number of strict trees weight n
1077 = number where 7 outnumbers every other digit in the number
1078 = Euler transform of negative integers
1079 = every positive integer is the sum of at most 1079 tenth powers.
1080 = pentagonal number
1081 = triangular number, member of Padovan sequence
1082 = central polygonal number
1083 = three-quarter square, number of partitions of 53 into prime parts
1084 = third spoke of a hexagonal spiral, 108464 + 1 is prime
1085 = number of partitions of n into distinct parts > or = 2
1086 = Smith number, sum of totient function for first 59 integers
1087 = super-prime, cousin prime, lucky prime
1088 = octo-triangular number, (triangular number result being 136) sum of two distinct powers of 2, (1024 + 64) number that is divisible by exactly seven primes with the inclusion of multiplicity
1089 = 332, nonagonal number, centered octagonal number, first natural number whose digits in its decimal representation get reversed when multiplied by 9.
1090 = sum of 5 positive 5th powers
1091 = cousin prime and twin prime with 1093
1092 = divisible by the number of primes below it
1093 = the smallest Wieferich prime (the only other known Wieferich prime is 3511), twin prime with 1091 and star number
1094 = sum of 9 positive 5th powers, 109464 + 1 is prime
1095 = sum of 10 positive 5th powers, number that is not the sum of two palindromes
1096 = hendecagonal number, number of strict solid partitions of 18 
1097 = emirp, Chen prime
1098 = multiple of 9 containing digit 9 in its base-10 representation
1099 = number where 9 outnumbers every other digit

1100 to 1199 

1100 = number of partitions of 61 into distinct squarefree parts
1101 = pinwheel number
1102 = sum of totient function for first 60 integers
1103 = Sophie Germain prime, balanced prime
1104 = Keith number
1105 = 332 + 42 = 322 + 92 = 312 + 122 = 232 + 242, Carmichael number, magic constant of n × n normal magic square and n-queens problem for n = 13, decagonal number, centered square number, Fermat pseudoprime
1106 = number of regions into which the plane is divided when drawing 24 ellipses
1107 = number of non-isomorphic strict T0 multiset partitions of weight 8
1108 = number k such that k64 + 1 is prime
1109 = Friedlander-Iwaniec prime, Chen prime
1110 = k such that 2k + 3 is prime
1111 = repdigit
1112 = k such that 9k - 2 is a prime
1113 = number of strict partions of 40
1114 = number of ways to write 22 as an orderless product of orderless sums
1115 = number of partitions of 27 into a prime number of parts
1116 = divisible by the number of primes below it
1117 = number of diagonally symmetric polyominoes with 16 cells, Chen prime
1118 = number of unimodular 2 × 2 matrices having all terms in {0,1,...,21}
1119 = number of bipartite graphs with 9 nodes
1120 = number k such that k64 + 1 is prime
1121 = number of squares between 342 and 344.
1122 = pronic number, divisible by the number of primes below it
1123 = balanced prime
1124 = Leyland number
1125 = Achilles number
1126 = number of 2 × 2 non-singular integer matrices with entries from {0, 1, 2, 3, 4, 5}
1127 = maximal number of pieces that can be obtained by cutting an annulus with 46 cuts
1128 = triangular number, hexagonal number, divisible by the number of primes below it
1129 = number of lattice points inside a circle of radius 19
1130 = skiponacci number
1131 = number of edges in the hexagonal triangle T(26)
1134 = divisible by the number of primes below it, triangular matchstick number
1135 = centered triangular number
1136 = number of independent vertex sets and vertex covers in the 7-sunlet graph
1137 = sum of values of vertices at level 5 of the hyperbolic Pascal pyramid
1138 = recurring number in the works of George Lucas and his companies, beginning with his first feature film – THX 1138; particularly, a special code for Easter eggs on Star Wars DVDs.
1139 = wiener index of the windmill graph D(3,17)
1140 = tetrahedral number
1141 = 7-Knödel number
1142 = n such that n32 + 1 is prime
1145 = 5-Knödel number
1151 = first prime following a prime gap of 22, Chen prime
1152 = highly totient number, 3-smooth number (27×32), area of a square with diagonal 48, Achilles number
1153 = super-prime, Proth prime
1154 = 2 × 242 + 2 = number of points on surface of tetrahedron with edgelength 24
1155 = number of edges in the join of two cycle graphs, both of order 33
1156 = 342, octahedral number, centered pentagonal number, centered hendecagonal number.
1158 = number of points on surface of octahedron with edgelength 17
1159 = member of the Mian–Chowla sequence, a centered octahedral number
1160 = octagonal number
1161 = sum of the first 26 primes
1162 = pentagonal number, sum of totient function for first 61 integers
1163 = smallest prime > 342. See Legendre's conjecture. Chen prime.
1165 = 5-Knödel number
1166 = heptagonal pyramidal number
1167 = number of rational numbers which can be constructed from the set of integers between 1 and 43
1169 = highly cototient number
1170 = highest possible score in a National Academic Quiz Tournaments (NAQT) match
1171 = super-prime
1174 = number of widely totally strongly normal compositions of 16
1175 = maximal number of pieces that can be obtained by cutting an annulus with 47 cuts
1176 = triangular number
1177 = heptagonal number
1178 = number of surface points on a cube with edge-length 15
1183 = pentagonal pyramidal number
1184 = amicable number with 1210
1185 = number of partitions of 45 into pairwise relatively prime parts
1186 = number of diagonally symmetric polyominoes with 15 cells, number of partitions of 54 into prime parts
1187 = safe prime, Stern prime, balanced prime, Chen prime
1189 = number of squares between 352 and 354.
1190 = pronic number, number of cards to build an 28-tier house of cards
1191 = 352 - 35 + 1 = H35 (the 35th Hogben number)
1192 = sum of totient function for first 62 integers
1193 = a number such that 41193 - 31193 is prime, Chen prime
1196 = 
1197 = pinwheel number
1198 = centered heptagonal number
1199 = area of the 20th conjoined trapezoid

1200 to 1299 

1200 = the long thousand, ten "long hundreds" of 120 each, the traditional reckoning of large numbers in Germanic languages, the number of households the Nielsen ratings sample, number k such that k64 + 1 is prime
1201 = centered square number, super-prime, centered decagonal number
1202 = number of regions the plane is divided into by 25 ellipses
1205 = number of partitions of 28 such that the number of odd parts is a part
1207 = composite de Polignac number
1210 = amicable number with 1184
1211 = composite de Polignac number
1213 = emirp
1214 = sum of first 39 composite numbers
1215 = number of edges in the hexagonal triangle T(27)
1216 = nonagonal number
1217 = super-prime, Proth prime
1218 = triangular matchstick number
1219 = Mertens function zero, centered triangular number
1220 = Mertens function zero, number of binary vectors of length 16 containing no singletons
1222 = hexagonal pyramidal number
1223 = Sophie Germain prime, balanced prime, 200th prime number
1224 = number of edges in the join of two cycle graphs, both of order 34
1225 = 352, square triangular number, hexagonal number, centered octagonal number
1228 = sum of totient function for first 63 integers
1229 = Sophie Germain prime, number of primes between 0 and 10000, emirp
1230 = the Mahonian number: T(9, 6)
1233 = 122 + 332
1234 = number of parts in all partitions of 30 into distinct parts, smallest whole number containing all numbers from 1 to 4
1236 = 617 + 619: sum of twin prime pair
1237 = prime of the form 2p-1
1238 = number of partitions of 31 that do not contain 1 as a part
1240 = square pyramidal number
1241 = centered cube number
1242 = decagonal number
1243 = composite de Polignac number
1244 = number of complete partitions of 25
1247 = pentagonal number
1249 = emirp, trimorphic number
1250 = area of a square with diagonal 50
1251 = 2 × 252 + 1 = number of different 2 × 2 determinants with integer entries from 0 to 25
1252 = 2 × 252 + 2 = number of points on surface of tetrahedron with edgelength 25
1253 = number of partitions of 23 with at least one distinct part
1255 = Mertens function zero, number of ways to write 23 as an orderless product of orderless sums, number of partitions of 23
1256 = Mertens function zero
1257 = number of lattice points inside a circle of radius 20
1258 = Mertens function zero
1259 = highly cototient number
1260 = highly composite number, pronic number, the smallest vampire number, sum of totient function for first 64 integers, number of strict partions of 41 and appears twice in the Book of Revelation
1261 = star number, Mertens function zero
1262 = maximal number of regions the plane is divided into by drawing 36 circles
1263 = rounded total surface area of a regular tetrahedron with edge length 27
1264 = sum of the first 27 primes
1265 = number of rooted trees with 43 vertices in which vertices at the same level have the same degree
1266 = centered pentagonal number, Mertens function zero
1267 = 7-Knödel number
1268 = number of partitions of 37 into prime power parts
1270 = Mertens function zero
1271 = sum of first 40 composite numbers
1274 = sum of the nontriangular numbers between successive triangular numbers
1275 = triangular number, sum of the first 50 natural numbers
1276 = number of irredundant sets in the 25-cocktail party graph
1277 = the start of a prime constellation of length 9 (a "prime nonuple")
1278 = number of Narayana's cows and calves after 20 years
1279 = Mertens function zero, Mersenne prime exponent
1280 = Mertens function zero, number of parts in all compositions of 9
1281 = octagonal number
1282 = Mertens function zero, number of partitions of 46 into pairwise relatively prime parts
1283 = safe prime
1284 = 641 + 643: sum of twin prime pair
1285 = Mertens function zero, number of free nonominoes, number of parallelogram polyominoes with 10 cells.
1288 = heptagonal number
1289 = Sophie Germain prime, Mertens function zero
1291 = Mertens function zero
1292 = Mertens function zero
1294 = rounded volume of a regular octahedron with edge length 14
1295 = number of edges in the join of two cycle graphs, both of order 35
1296 = 362 = 64, sum of the cubes of the first eight positive integers, the number of rectangles on a normal 8 × 8 chessboard, also the maximum font size allowed in Adobe InDesign
1297 = super-prime, Mertens function zero, pinwheel number
1298 = number of partitions of 55 into prime parts
1299 = Mertens function zero, number of partitions of 52 such that the smallest part is greater than or equal to number of parts

1300 to 1399 

1300 = Sum of the first 4 fifth powers, mertens function zero, largest possible win margin in an NAQT match
1301 = centered square number, Honaker prime, number of trees with 13 unlabeled nodes
1302 = Mertens function zero, number of edges in the hexagonal triangle T(28)
1305 = triangular matchstick number
1306 = Mertens function zero. In base 10, raising the digits of 1306 to powers of successive integers equals itself:  135, 175, 518, and 598 also have this property. Centered triangular number.
1307 = safe prime
1308 = sum of totient function for first 65 integers
1309 = the first sphenic number followed by two consecutive such number
1311 = number of integer partitions of 32 with no part dividing all the others
1312 = member of the Mian-Chowla sequence; code for "ACAB" itself an acronym for "all cops are bastards"
1314 = number of integer partitions of 41 whose distinct parts are connected
1318 = Mertens function zero
1319 = safe prime
1320 = 659 + 661: sum of twin prime pair
1321 = Friedlander-Iwaniec prime
1322 = area of the 21th conjoined trapezoid
1323 = Achilles number
1325 = Markov number, centered tetrahedral number
1326 = triangular number, hexagonal number, Mertens function zero
1327 = first prime followed by 33 consecutive composite numbers
1328 = sum of totient function for first 66 integers
1329 = Mertens function zero, sum of first 41 composite numbers
1330 = tetrahedral number, forms a Ruth–Aaron pair with 1331 under second definition
1331 = 113, centered heptagonal number, forms a Ruth–Aaron pair with 1330 under second definition.  This is the only non-trivial cube of the form x2 + x − 1, for x = 36.
1332 = pronic number
1333 = 372 - 37 + 1 = H37 (the 37th Hogben number)
1334 = maximal number of regions the plane is divided into by drawing 37 circles
1335 = pentagonal number, Mertens function zero
1336 = Mertens function zero
1337 = Used in the novel form of spelling called leet.  Approximate melting point of gold in kelvins.
1338 = Mertens function zero
1340 = k such that 5 × 2k - 1 is prime
1342 = , Mertens function zero
1343 = cropped hexagone
1344 = 372 - 52, the only way to express 1344 as a difference of prime squares
1345 = k such that k, k+1 and k+2 are products of two primes
1349 = Stern-Jacobsthal number
1350 = nonagonal number
1351 = number of partitions of 28 into a prime number of parts
1352 = number of surface points on a cube with edge-length 16, Achilles number
1353 = 2 × 262 + 1 = number of different 2 × 2 determinants with integer entries from 0 to 26
1354 = 2 × 262 + 2 = number of points on surface of tetrahedron with edgelength 26
1357 = number of nonnegative solutions to x2 + y2 ≤ 412
1358 = rounded total surface area of a regular tetrahedron with edge length 28
1360 = 372 - 32, the only way to express 1360 as a difference of prime squares
1361 = first prime following a prime gap of 34, centered decagonal number, Honaker prime
1362 = number of achiral integer partitions of 48
1365 = pentatope number
1367 = safe prime, balanced prime, sum of three, nine, and eleven consecutive primes (449 + 457 + 461, 131 + 137 + 139 + 149 + 151 + 157 + 163 + 167 + 173, and 101 + 103 + 107 + 109 + 113 + 127 + 131 + 137 + 139 + 149 + 151),
1368 = number of edges in the join of two cycle graphs, both of order 36
1369 = 372, centered octagonal number
1370 = σ2(37): sum of squares of divisors of 37
1371 = sum of the first 28 primes
1372 = Achilles number
1373 = number of lattice points inside a circle of radius 21
1374 = number of unimodular 2 × 2 matrices having all terms in {0,1,...,23}
1375 = decagonal pyramidal number
1376 = primitive abundant number (abundant number all of whose proper divisors are deficient numbers)
1377 = maximal number of pieces that can be obtained by cutting an annulus with 51 cuts
1378 = triangular number
1379 = magic constant of n × n normal magic square and n-queens problem for n = 14.
1380 = number of 8-step mappings with 4 inputs
1381 = centered pentagonal numberMertens function zero
1384 = 
1385 = up/down number
1386 = octagonal pyramidal number
1387 = 5th Fermat pseudoprime of base 2, 22nd centered hexagonal number and the 19th decagonal number, second Super-Poulet number.
1389 = sum of first 42 composite numbers
1391 = number of rational numbers which can be constructed from the set of integers between 1 and 47
1392 = number of edges in the hexagonal triangle T(29)
1393 = 7-Knödel number
1394 = sum of totient function for first 67 integers
1395 = vampire number, member of the Mian–Chowla sequence triangular matchstick number
1396 = centered triangular number
1398 = number of integer partitions of 40 whose distinct parts are connected

1400 to 1499 
1400 = number of sum-free subsets of {1, ..., 15}
1401 = pinwheel number
1402 = number of integer partitions of 48 whose augmented differences are distinct
1404 = heptagonal number
1405 = 262 + 272, 72 + 82 + ... + 162, centered square number
1406 = pronic number, semi-meandric number
1407 = 382 - 38 + 1 = H38 (the 38th Hogben number)
1408 = maximal number of regions the plane is divided into by drawing 38 circles
1409 = super-prime, Sophie Germain prime, smallest number whose eighth power is the sum of 8 eighth powers, Proth prime
1414 = smallest composite that when added to sum of prime factors reaches a prime after 27 iterations
1415 = the Mahonian number: T(8, 8)
1417 = number of partitions of 32 in which the number of parts divides 32
1419 = Zeisel number
1420 = Number of partitions of 56 into prime parts
1423 = 200 + 1223 and the 200th prime is 1223 Also Used as a Hate symbol
1424 = number of nonnegative solutions to x2 + y2 ≤ 422
1425 = self-descriptive number in base 5
1426 = sum of totient function for first 68 integers, pentagonal number, number of strict partions of 42
1429 = number of partitions of 53 such that the smallest part is greater than or equal to number of parts
1430 = Catalan number
1431 = triangular number, hexagonal number
1432 = member of Padovan sequence
1433 = super-prime, Honaker prime, typical port used for remote connections to Microsoft SQL Server databases
1434 = rounded volume of a regular tetrahedron with edge length 23
1435 = vampire number; the standard railway gauge in millimetres, equivalent to 
1437 = smallest number of complexity 20: smallest number requiring 20 1's to build using +, * and ^
1438 = k such that 5 × 2k - 1 is prime
1439 = Sophie Germain prime, safe prime
1440 = a highly totient number and a 481-gonal number. Also, the number of minutes in one day, the blocksize of a standard  floppy disk, and the horizontal resolution of WXGA(II) computer displays
1441 = star number
1442 = number of parts in all partitions of 31 into distinct parts
1443 = the sum of the second trio of three-digit permutable primes  in decimal: 337, 373, and 733. Also the number of edges in the join of two cycle graphs, both of order 37
1444 = 382, smallest pandigital number in Roman numerals
1446 = number of points on surface of octahedron with edgelength 19
1447 = super-prime, happy number
1448 = number k such that phi(prime(k)) is a square
1449 = Stella octangula number
1450 = σ2(34): sum of squares of divisors of 34
1451 = Sophie Germain prime
1452 = first Zagreb index of the complete graph K12
1453 = Sexy prime with 1459
1454 = 3 × 222 + 2 = number of points on surface of square pyramid of side-length 22
1455 = k such that geometric mean of phi(k) and sigma(k) is an integer
1457 = 2 × 272 − 1 = a twin square
1458 = maximum determinant of an 11 by 11 matrix of zeroes and ones, 3-smooth number (2×36)
1459 = Sexy prime with 1453, sum of nine consecutive primes (139 + 149 + 151 + 157 + 163 + 167 + 173 + 179 + 181), pierpont prime
1460 = Nickname of the original "Doc Marten's" boots, released 1 April 1960
1461 = number of partitions of 38 into prime power parts
1462 = (35 - 1) × (35 + 8) = the first Zagreb index of the wheel graph with 35 vertices
1463 = total number of parts in all partitions of 16
1464 = rounded total surface area of a regular icosahedron with edge length 13
1465 = 5-Knödel number
1469 = octahedral number, highly cototient number
1470 = pentagonal pyramidal number, sum of totient function for first 69 integers
1471 = super-prime, centered heptagonal number
1473 = cropped hexagone
1476 = coreful perfect number
1477 = 7-Knödel number
1479 = number of planar partitions of 12
1480 = sum of the first 29 primes
1481 = Sophie Germain prime
1482 = pronic number, number of unimodal compositions of 15 where the maximal part appears once
1483 = 392 - 39 + 1 = H39 (the 39th Hogben number)
1484 = maximal number of regions the plane is divided into by drawing 39 circles
1485 = triangular number
1486 = number of strict solid partitions of 19 
1487 = safe prime
1488 = triangular matchstick number Also used as a hate symbol
1489 = centered triangular number
1490 = tetranacci number
1491 = nonagonal number, Mertens function zero
1492 = Mertens function zero
1493 = Stern prime
1494 = sum of totient function for first 70 integers
1496 = square pyramidal number
1497 = skiponacci number
1498 = number of flat partitions of 41
1499 = Sophie Germain prime, super-prime

1500 to 1599 

1500 = hypotenuse in three different Pythagorean triangles
1501 = centered pentagonal number
1502 = number of pairs of consecutive integers x, x+1 such that all prime factors of both x and x+1 are at most 47
1504 = primitive abundant number (abundant number all of whose proper divisors are deficient numbers)
1507 = number of partitions of 32 that do not contain 1 as a part
1508 = heptagonal pyramidal number
1509 = pinwheel number
1510 = deficient number, odious number
1511 = Sophie Germain prime, balanced prime
1512 = k such that geometric mean of phi(k) and sigma(k) is an integer
1513 = centered square number
1514 = sum of first 44 composite numbers
1517 = number of lattice points inside a circle of radius 22
1518 = Mertens function zero
1519 = Mertens function zero
1520 = pentagonal number, Mertens function zero, forms a Ruth–Aaron pair with 1521 under second definition
1521 = 392, Mertens function zero, centered octagonal number, forms a Ruth–Aaron pair with 1520 under second definition
1522 = k such that 5 × 2k - 1 is prime
1523 = super-prime, Mertens function zero, safe prime, member of the Mian–Chowla sequence
1524 = Mertens function zero, k such that geometric mean of phi(k) and sigma(k) is an integer
1525 = heptagonal number, Mertens function zero
1526 = number of conjugacy classes in the alternating group A27
1527 = Mertens function zero
1528 = Mertens function zero, rounded total surface area of a regular octahedron with edge length 21
1529 = composite de Polignac number
1530 = vampire number
1531 = prime number, centered decagonal number, Mertens function zero
1532 = Mertens function zero
1534 = number of achiral integer partitions of 50
1535 = Thabit number
1536 = a common size of microplate, 3-smooth number (29×3), number of threshold functions of exactly 4 variables
1537 = Keith number, Mertens function zero
1538 = number of surface points on a cube with edge-length 17 
1539 = maximal number of pieces that can be obtained by cutting an annulus with 54 cuts
1540 = triangular number, hexagonal number, decagonal number, tetrahedral number
1541 = octagonal number
1543 = Mertens function zero
1544 = Mertens function zero, number of partitions of integer partitions of 17 where all parts have the same length
1546 = Mertens function zero
1547 = hexagonal pyramidal number
1548 = coreful perfect number
1549 = de Polignac prime
1552 = Number of partitions of 57 into prime parts
1556 = sum of the squares of the first nine primes
1557 = number of graphs with 8 nodes and 13 edges
1558 = number k such that k64 + 1 is prime
1559 = Sophie Germain prime
1560 = pronic number
1561 = a centered octahedral number, number of series-reduced trees with 19 nodes
1562 = maximal number of regions the plane is divided into by drawing 40 circles
1564 = sum of totient function for first 71 integers
1565 =  and 
1566 = number k such that k64 + 1 is prime
1567 = number of partitions of 24 with at least one distinct part
1568 = Achilles number
1569 = 2 × 282 + 1 = number of different 2 × 2 determinants with integer entries from 0 to 28
1570 = 2 × 282 + 2 = number of points on surface of tetrahedron with edgelength 28
1571 = Honaker prime
1572 = member of the Mian–Chowla sequence
1575 = odd abundant number, sum of the nontriangular numbers between successive triangular numbers, number of partitions of 24
1578 = sum of first 45 composite numbers
1579 = number of partitions of 54 such that the smallest part is greater than or equal to number of parts
1580 = number of achiral integer partitions of 51
1581 = number of edges in the hexagonal triangle T(31)
1583 = Sophie Germain prime
1584 = triangular matchstick number
1585 = Riordan number, centered triangular number
1586 = area of the 23th conjoined trapezoid
1588 = sum of totient function for first 72 integers
1589 = composite de Polignac number
1590 = rounded volume of a regular icosahedron with edge length 9
1591 = rounded volume of a regular octahedron with edge length 15
1593 = sum of the first 30 primes
1594 = minimal cost of maximum height Huffman tree of size 17
1595 = number of non-isomorphic set-systems of weight 10
1596 = triangular number
1597 = Fibonacci prime, Markov prime, super-prime, emirp
1598 = number of unimodular 2 × 2 matrices having all terms in {0,1,...,25}
1599 = number of edges in the join of two cycle graphs, both of order 39

1600 to 1699 

1600 = 402, structured great rhombicosidodecahedral number, repdigit in base 7 (44447), street number on Pennsylvania Avenue of the White House, length in meters of a common High School Track Event, perfect score on SAT (except from 2005 to 2015)
1601 = Sophie Germain prime, Proth prime, the novel 1601 (Mark Twain)
1602 = number of points on surface of octahedron with edgelength 20
1603 = number of partitions of 27 with nonnegative rank
1606 = enneagonal pyramidal number
1608 = 
1609 = cropped hexagonal number
1610 = number of strict partions of 43
1611 = number of rational numbers which can be constructed from the set of integers between 1 and 51
1617 = pentagonal number
1618 = centered heptagonal number
1619 = palindromic prime in binary, safe prime
1620 = 809 + 811: sum of twin prime pair
1621 = super-prime, pinwheel number
1624 = number of squares in the Aztec diamond of order 28
1625 = centered square number
1626 = centered pentagonal number
1629 = rounded volume of a regular tetrahedron with edge length 24
1630 = number k such that k^64 + 1 is prime
1632 = number of acute triangles made from the vertices of a regular 18-polygon
1633 = star number
1634 = Narcissistic number in base 10
1635 = number of partitions of 56 whose reciprocal sum is an integer
1636 = number of nonnegative solutions to x2 + y2 ≤ 452
1637 = prime island: least prime whose adjacent primes are exactly 30 apart
1638 = harmonic divisor number, 5 × 21638 - 1 is prime
1639 = nonagonal number
1640 = pronic number
1641 = 412 - 41 + 1 = H41 (the 41st Hogben number)
1642 = maximal number of regions the plane is divided into by drawing 41 circles
1643 = sum of first 46 composite numbers
1644 = 821 + 823: sum of twin prime pair
1645 = number of 16-celled pseudo still lifes in Conway's Game of Life, up to rotation and reflection
1646 = number of graphs with 8 nodes and 14 edges
1647 and 1648 are both divisible by cubes
1648 = number of partitions of 343 into distinct cubes
1649 = highly cototient number, Leyland number
1650 = number of cards to build an 33-tier house of cards
1651 = heptagonal number
1652 = number of partitions of 29 into a prime number of parts
1653 = triangular number, hexagonal number, number of lattice points inside a circle of radius 23
1654 = number of partitions of 42 into divisors of 42
1655 = rounded volume of a regular dodecahedron with edge length 6
1656 = 827 + 829: sum of twin prime pair
1657 = cuban prime, prime of the form 2p-1
1658 = smallest composite that when added to sum of prime factors reaches a prime after 25 iterations
1659 = number of rational numbers which can be constructed from the set of integers between 1 and 52
1660 = sum of totient function for first 73 integers
1661 = a number with only palindromic divisors
1662 = number of partitions of 49 into pairwise relatively prime parts
1663 = a prime number and 51663 - 41663 is a 1163-digit prime number
1664 = k such that k, k+1 and k+2 are sums of 2 squares
1665 = centered tetrahedral number
1666 = largest efficient pandigital number in Roman numerals (each symbol occurs exactly once)
1667 = 228 + 1439 and the 228th prime is 1439
1668 = number of partitions of 33 into parts all relatively prime to 33
1669 = super-prime, smallest prime with a gap of exactly 24 to the next prime
1670 = number of compositions of 12 such that at least two adjacent parts are equal
1671 divides the sum of the first 1671 composite numbers
1672 = 412 - 22, the only way to express 1672 as a difference of prime squares
1673 = RMS number
1674 = k such that geometric mean of phi(k) and sigma(k) is an integer
1675 = Kin number
1676 = number of partitions of 34 into parts each of which is used a different number of times
1677 = 412 - 32, the only way to express 1677 as a difference of prime squares
1678 = n such that n32 + 1 is prime
1679 = highly cototient number, semiprime (23 × 73, see also Arecibo message), number of parts in all partitions of 32 into distinct parts
1680 = highly composite number, number of edges in the join of two cycle graphs, both of order 40
1681 = 412, smallest number yielded by the formula n2 + n + 41 that is not a prime; centered octagonal number
1682 = and 1683 is a member of a Ruth–Aaron pair (first definition)
1683 = triangular matchstick number
1684 = centered triangular number
1685 = 5-Knödel number
1686 = 
1687 = 7-Knödel number
1688 = number of finite connected sets of positive integers greater than one with least common multiple 72
1689 = 
1690 = number of compositions of 14 into powers of 2
1691 = the same upside down, which makes it a strobogrammatic number
1692 = coreful perfect number
1693 = smallest prime > 412.
1694 = number of unimodular 2 × 2 matrices having all terms in {0,1,...,26}
1695 = magic constant of n × n normal magic square and n-queens problem for n = 15. Number of partitions of 58 into prime parts
1696 = sum of totient function for first 74 integers
1697 = Friedlander-Iwaniec prime
1698 = number of rooted trees with 47 vertices in which vertices at the same level have the same degree
1699 = number of rooted trees with 48 vertices in which vertices at the same level have the same degree

1700 to 1799 

1700 = σ2(39): sum of squares of divisors of 39
1701 = , decagonal number, hull number of the U.S.S. Enterprise on Star Trek
1702 = palindromic in 3 consecutive bases: 89814, 78715, 6A616
1703 = 1703131131 / 1000077 and the divisors of 1703 are 1703, 131, 13 and 1 
1704 = sum of the squares of the parts in the partitions of 18 into two distinct parts
1705 = tribonacci number
1706 = 1 + 4 + 16 + 64 + 256 + 1024 + 256 + 64 + 16 + 4 + 1 sum of fifth row of triangle of powers of 4
1707 = number of partitions of 30 in which the number of parts divides 30
1708 = 22 × 7 × 61 a number whose product of prime indices 1 × 1 × 4 × 18 is divisible by its sum of prime factors 2 + 2 + 7 + 61
1709 = first of a sequence of eight primes formed by adding 57 in the middle. 1709, 175709, 17575709, 1757575709, 175757575709, 17575757575709, 1757575757575709 and 175757575757575709 are all prime, but 17575757575757575709 = 232433 × 75616446785773
1710 = maximal number of pieces that can be obtained by cutting an annulus with 57 cuts
1711 = triangular number, centered decagonal number
1712 = number of irredundant sets in the 29-cocktail party graph
1713 = number of aperiodic rooted trees with 12 nodes
1714 = number of regions formed by drawing the line segments connecting any two of the 18 perimeter points of an 3 × 6 grid of squares
1715 = k such that geometric mean of phi(k) and sigma(k) is an integer
1716 = 857 + 859: sum of twin prime pair
1717 = pentagonal number
1718 = 
1719 = composite de Polignac number
1720 = sum of the first 31 primes
1721 = twin prime; number of squares between 422 and 424.
1722 = Giuga number, pronic number
1723 = super-prime
1724 = maximal number of regions the plane is divided into by drawing 42 circles
1725 = 472 - 222 = (prime(15))2 - (nonprime(15))2
1726 = number of partitions of 44 into distinct and relatively prime parts
1727 = area of the 24th conjoined trapezoid
1728 = the quantity expressed as 1000 in duodecimal, that is, the cube of twelve (called a great gross), and so, the number of cubic inches in a cubic foot, palindromic in base 11 (133111) and 23 (36323)
1729 = taxicab number, Carmichael number, Zeisel number, centered cube number, Hardy–Ramanujan number.  In the decimal expansion of e the first time all 10 digits appear in sequence starts at the 1729th digit (or 1728th decimal place).  In 1979 the rock musical Hair closed on Broadway in New York City after 1729 performances. Palindromic in bases 12, 32, 36.
1730 = 3 × 242 + 2 = number of points on surface of square pyramid of side-length 24
1731 = k such that geometric mean of phi(k) and sigma(k) is an integer
1732 = 
1733 = Sophie Germain prime, palindromic in bases 3, 18, 19.
1734 = surface area of a cube of edge length 17
1735 = number of partitions of 55 such that the smallest part is greater than or equal to number of parts
1736 = sum of totient function for first 75 integers, number of surface points on a cube with edge-length 18
1737 = pinwheel number
1738 = number of achiral integer partitions of 52
1739 = number of 1s in all partitions of 30 into odd parts
1740 = number of squares in the Aztec diamond of order 29
1741 = super-prime, centered square number
1742 = number of regions the plane is divided into by 30 ellipses
1743 = wiener index of the windmill graph D(3,21)
1744 = k such that k, k+1 and k+2 are sums of 2 squares
1745 = 5-Knödel number
1746 = number of unit-distance graphs on 8 nodes
1747 = balanced prime
1748 = number of partitions of 55 into distinct parts in which the number of parts divides 55
1749 = number of integer partitions of 33 with no part dividing all the others
1750 = hypotenuse in three different Pythagorean triangles
1751 = cropped hexagone
1752 = 792 - 672, the only way to express 1752 as a difference of prime squares
1753 = balanced prime
1754 = k such that 5*2k - 1 is prime
1755 = number of integer partitions of 50 whose augmented differences are distinct
1756 = centered pentagonal number
1758 = 
1759 = de Polignac prime
1760 = the number of yards in a mile
1761 = k such that k, k+1 and k+2 are products of two primes
1762 = number of binary sequences of length 12 and curling number 2
1763 = number of edges in the join of two cycle graphs, both of order 41
1764 = 422
1765 = number of stacks, or planar partitions of 15
1766 = number of points on surface of octahedron with edgelength 21
1767 = σ(282) = σ(352)
1768 = number of nonequivalent dissections of an hendecagon into 8 polygons by nonintersecting diagonals up to rotation
1769 = maximal number of pieces that can be obtained by cutting an annulus with 58 cuts
1770 = triangular number, hexagonal number, Seventeen Seventy, town in Australia
1771 = tetrahedral number
1772 = centered heptagonal number, sum of totient function for first 76 integers
1773 = number of words of length 5 over the alphabet {1,2,3,4,5} such that no two even numbers appear consecutively
1774 = number of rooted identity trees with 15 nodes and 5 leaves
1775 = : sum of piles of first 10 primes
1776 = square star number
1777 = smallest prime > 422.
1778 = least k >= 1 such that the remainder when 6k is divided by k is 22
1779 = number of achiral integer partitions of 53
1780 = number of lattice paths from (0, 0) to (7, 7) using E (1, 0) and N (0, 1) as steps that horizontally cross the diagonal y = x with even many times
1781 = the first 1781 digits of e form a prime
1782 = heptagonal number
1783 = de Polignac prime
1784 = number of subsets of {1, 2, 3, 4, 5, 6, 7, 8, 9, 10, 11, 12} such that every pair of distinct elements has a different quotient
1785 = square pyramidal number, triangular matchstick number
1786 = centered triangular number
1787 = super-prime, sum of eleven consecutive primes (137 + 139 + 149 + 151 + 157 + 163 + 167 + 173 + 179 + 181 + 191)
1788 = Euler transform of -1, -2, ..., -34
1789 = number of wiggly sums adding to 17 (terms alternately increase and decrease or vice versa)
1790 = number of partitions of 50 into pairwise relatively prime parts
1791 = largest natural number that cannot be expressed as a sum of at most four hexagonal numbers.
1792 = Granville number
1793 = number of lattice points inside a circle of radius 24
1794 = nonagonal number, number of partitions of 33 that do not contain 1 as a part
1795 = number of heptagons with perimeter 38
1796 = k such that geometric mean of phi(k) and sigma(k) is an integer
1797 = number k such that phi(prime(k)) is a square
1798 = 2 × 29 × 31 = 102 × 111012 × 111112, which yield zero when the prime factors are xored together
1799 = 2 × 302 − 1 = a twin square

1800 to 1899 

1800 = pentagonal pyramidal number, Achilles number, also, in da Ponte's Don Giovanni, the number of women Don Giovanni had slept with so far when confronted by Donna Elvira, according to Leporello's tally
1801 = cuban prime, sum of five and nine consecutive primes (349 + 353 + 359 + 367 + 373 and 179 + 181 + 191 + 193 + 197 + 199 + 211 + 223 + 227)
1802 = 2 × 302 + 2 = number of points on surface of tetrahedron with edgelength 30, number of partitions of 30 such that the number of odd parts is a part
1803 = number of decahexes that tile the plane isohedrally but not by translation or by 180-degree rotation (Conway criterion)
1804 = number k such that k^64 + 1 is prime
1805 = number of squares between 432 and 434.
1806 = pronic number, product of first four terms of Sylvester's sequence, primary pseudoperfect number, only number for which n equals the denominator of the nth Bernoulli number, Schröder number
1807 = fifth term of Sylvester's sequence
1808 = maximal number of regions the plane is divided into by drawing 43 circles
1809 = sum of first 17 super-primes
1810 = 
1811 = Sophie Germain prime
1812 = n such that n32 + 1 is prime
1813 = number of polyominoes with 26 cells, symmetric about two orthogonal axes
1814 = 1 + 6 + 36 + 216  + 1296 + 216 + 36 + 6 + 1 = sum of 4th row of triangle of powers of six
1815 = polygonal chain number 
1816 = number of strict partions of 44
1817 = total number of prime parts in all partitions of 20
1818 = n such that n32 + 1 is prime
1819 = sum of the first 32 primes, minus 32
1820 = pentagonal number, pentatope number, number of compositions of 13 whose run-lengths are either weakly increasing or weakly decreasing
1821 = member of the Mian–Chowla sequence
1822 = number of integer partitions of 43 whose distinct parts are connected
1823 = super-prime, safe prime
1824 = 432 - 52, the only way to express 1824 as a difference of prime squares
1825 = octagonal number
1826 = decagonal pyramidal number
1827 = vampire number
1828 = meandric number, open meandric number, appears twice in the first 10 decimal digits of e
1829 = composite de Polignac number
1830 = triangular number
1831 = smallest prime with a gap of exactly 16 to next prime (1847)
1832 = sum of totient function for first 77 integers
1833 = number of atoms in a decahedron with 13 shells
1834 = octahedral number, sum of the cubes of the first five primes
1835 = absolute value of numerator of 
1836 = factor by which a proton is more massive than an electron
1837 = star number
1838 = number of unimodular 2 × 2 matrices having all terms in {0,1,...,27}
1839 = 
1840 = 432 - 32, the only way to express 1840 as a difference of prime squares
1841 = Mertens function zero
1842 = number of unlabeled rooted trees with 11 nodes
1843 = Mertens function zero
1844 = Mertens function zero
1845 = Mertens function zero
1846 = sum of first 49 composite numbers
1847 = super-prime
1848 = number of edges in the join of two cycle graphs, both of order 42
1849 = 432, palindromic in base 6 (= 123216), centered octagonal number
1850 = Number of partitions of 59 into prime parts
1851 = sum of the first 32 primes
1852 = number of quantales on 5 elements, up to isomorphism
1853 = Mertens function zero
1854 = Mertens function zero
1855 = rencontres number: number of permutations of [7] with exactly one fixed point
1856 = sum of totient function for first 78 integers
1857 = Mertens function zero, pinwheel number
1858 = number of 14-carbon alkanes C14H30 ignoring stereoisomers
1859 = composite de Polignac number
1860 = number of squares in the Aztec diamond of order 30
1861 = centered square number, Mertens function zero
1862 = Mertens function zero, forms a Ruth–Aaron pair with 1863 under second definition
1863 = Mertens function zero, forms a Ruth–Aaron pair with 1862 under second definition
1864 = Mertens function zero,  is a prime
1865 = 123456: Largest senary metadrome (number with digits in strict ascending order in base 6)
1866 = Mertens function zero, number of plane partitions of 16 with at most two rows
1867 = prime de Polignac number
1868 = smallest number of complexity 21: smallest number requiring 21 1's to build using +, * and ^
1869 = Hultman number: SH(7, 4)
1870 = decagonal number
1871 = the first prime of the 2 consecutive twin prime pairs: (1871, 1873) and (1877, 1879)
1872 = first Zagreb index of the complete graph K13
1873 = number of Narayana's cows and calves after 21 years
1874 = area of the 25th conjoined trapezoid
1875 = 502 - 252
1876 = number k such that k^64 + 1 is prime
1877 = number of partitions of 39 where 39 divides the product of the parts
1878 = n such that n32 + 1 is prime
1879 = a prime with square index
1880 = the 10th element of the self convolution of Lucas numbers
1881 = tricapped prism number
1882 = number of linearly separable boolean functions in 4 variables
1883 = number of conjugacy classes in the alternating group A28
1884 = k such that 5*2k - 1 is prime
1885 = Zeisel number
1886 = number of partitions of 64 into fourth powers
1887 = number of edges in the hexagonal triangle T(34)
1888 = primitive abundant number (abundant number all of whose proper divisors are deficient numbers)
1889 = Sophie Germain prime, highly cototient number
1890 = triangular matchstick number
1891 = triangular number, hexagonal number, centered pentagonal number, centered triangular number
1892 = pronic number
1893 = 442 - 44 + 1 = H44 (the 44th Hogben number)
1894 = maximal number of regions the plane is divided into by drawing 44 circles
1895 = Stern-Jacobsthal number
1896 = member of the Mian-Chowla sequence
1897 = member of Padovan sequence, number of triangle-free graphs on 9 vertices
1898 = smallest multiple of n whose digits sum to 26
1899 = cropped hexagone

1900 to 1999 

1900 = number of primes <= 214. Also 1900 (film) or Novecento, 1976 movie. 1900 was the year Thorold Gosset introduced his list of semiregular polytopes; it is also the year Max Brückner published his study of polyhedral models, including stellations of the icosahedron, such as the novel final stellation of the icosahedron. 
1901 = Sophie Germain prime, centered decagonal number
1902 = number of symmetric plane partitions of 27
1903 = generalized catalan number
1904 = number of flat partitions of 43
1905 = Fermat pseudoprime
1906 = number n such that 3n - 8 is prime
1907 = safe prime, balanced prime
1908 = coreful perfect number
1909 = hyperperfect number
1910 = number of compositions of 13 having exactly one fixed point
1911 = heptagonal pyramidal number
1912 = size of 6th maximum raising after one blind in pot-limit poker
1913 = super-prime, Honaker prime
1914 = number of bipartite partitions of 12 white objects and 3 black ones
1915 = number of nonisomorphic semigroups of order 5
1916 = sum of first 50 composite numbers
1917 = number of partitions of 51 into pairwise relatively prime parts
1918 = heptagonal number
1919 = smallest number with reciprocal of period length 36 in base 10
1920 = sum of the nontriangular numbers between successive triangular numbers
1921 = 4-dimensional centered cube number
1922 = Area of a square with diagonal 62
1923 = 2 × 312 + 1 = number of different 2 X 2 determinants with integer entries from 0 to 31
1924 = 2 × 312 + 2 = number of points on surface of tetrahedron with edgelength 31
1925 = number of ways to write 24 as an orderless product of orderless sums
1926 = pentagonal number
1927 = 211 - 112
1928 = number of distinct values taken by 2^2^...^2 (with 13 2's and parentheses inserted in all possible ways)
1929 = Mertens function zero, number of integer partitions of 42 whose distinct parts are connected
1930 = number of pairs of consecutive integers x, x+1 such that all prime factors of both x and x+1 are at most 53
1931 = Sophie Germain prime
1932 = number of partitions of 40 into prime power parts
1933 = centered heptagonal number, Honaker prime
1934 = sum of totient function for first 79 integers
1935 = number of edges in the join of two cycle graphs, both of order 43
1936 = 442, 18-gonal number, 324-gonal number.
1937 = number of chiral n-ominoes in 12-space, one cell labeled
1938 = Mertens function zero, number of points on surface of octahedron with edgelength 22
1939 = 7-Knödel number
1940 = the Mahonian number: T(8, 9)
1941 = maximal number of regions obtained by joining 16 points around a circle by straight lines
1942 = number k for which 10k + 1, 10k + 3, 10k + 7, 10k + 9 and 10k + 13 are primes
1943 = largest number not the sum of distinct tetradecagonal numbers
1944 = 3-smooth number (23×35), Achilles number
1945 = number of partitions of 25 into relatively prime parts such that multiplicities of parts are also relatively prime
1946 = number of surface points on a cube with edge-length 19
1947 = k such that 5·2k + 1 is a prime factor of a Fermat number 22m + 1 for some m
1948 = number of strict solid partitions of 20 
1949 = smallest prime > 442.
1950 = , largest number not the sum of distinct pentadecagonal numbers
1951 = cuban prime
1952 = number of covers of {1, 2, 3, 4}
1953 = triangular number
1956 = number of sum-free subsets of {1, ..., 16}
1955 = number of partitions of 25 with at least one distinct part
1956 = nonagonal number
1957 =  = total number of ordered k-tuples (k=0,1,2,3,4,5,6) of distinct elements from an 6-element set
1958 = number of partitions of 25
1959 = Heptanacci-Lucas number
1960 = number of parts in all partitions of 33 into distinct parts
1961 = number of lattice points inside a circle of radius 25
1962 = number of edges in the join of the complete graph K36 and the cycle graph C36
1963! - 1 is prime
1964 = number of linear forests of planted planar trees with 8 nodes
1965 = total number of parts in all partitions of 17
1966 = sum of totient function for first 80 integers
1967 = least edge-length of a square dissectable into at least 30 squares in the Mrs. Perkins's quilt problem
σ(1968) = σ(1967) + σ(1966)
1969 = Only value less than four million for which a "mod-ification" of the standard Ackermann Function does not stabilize
1970 =  number of compositions of two types of 9 having no even parts
1971 =  
1972 =  n such that  is prime
 1973 = Sophie Germain prime, Leonardo prime
1974 = number of binary vectors of length 17 containing no singletons
1975 = number of partitions of 28 with nonnegative rank
1976 = octagonal number
1977 = number of non-isomorphic multiset partitions of weight 9 with no singletons
1978 = n such that n | (3n + 5)
1979 = number of squares between 452 and 454.
1980 = pronic number
1981 = pinwheel number
1982 = maximal number of regions the plane is divided into by drawing 45 circles
1983 = skiponacci number
1984 = 11111000000 in binary, see also: 1984 (disambiguation)
1985 = centered square number
1986 = number of ways to write 25 as an orderless product of orderless sums
1987 = 300th prime number
1988 = sum of the first 33 primes
1989 = number of 9-step mappings with 4 inputs
1990 = Stella octangula number
1991 = the 46th Gullwing number, palindromic composite number with only palindromic prime factors
1992 = number of nonisomorphic sets of nonempty subsets of a 4-set
1993 = a number with the property that 41993 - 31993 is prime, number of partitions of 30 into a prime number of parts
1994 = Glaisher's function W(37)
1995 = number of unlabeled graphs on 9 vertices with independence number 6
1996 = a number with the property that (1996! + 3)/3 is prime
1997 = 
1998 = triangular matchstick number 
1999 = centered triangular number number of regular forms in a myriagram.

Prime numbers 

There are 135 prime numbers between 1000 and 2000:
1009, 1013, 1019, 1021, 1031, 1033, 1039, 1049, 1051, 1061, 1063, 1069, 1087, 1091, 1093, 1097, 1103, 1109, 1117, 1123, 1129, 1151, 1153, 1163, 1171, 1181, 1187, 1193, 1201, 1213, 1217, 1223, 1229, 1231, 1237, 1249, 1259, 1277, 1279, 1283, 1289, 1291, 1297, 1301, 1303, 1307, 1319, 1321, 1327, 1361, 1367, 1373, 1381, 1399, 1409, 1423, 1427, 1429, 1433, 1439, 1447, 1451, 1453, 1459, 1471, 1481, 1483, 1487, 1489, 1493, 1499, 1511, 1523, 1531, 1543, 1549, 1553, 1559, 1567, 1571, 1579, 1583, 1597, 1601, 1607, 1609, 1613, 1619, 1621, 1627, 1637, 1657, 1663, 1667, 1669, 1693, 1697, 1699, 1709, 1721, 1723, 1733, 1741, 1747, 1753, 1759, 1777, 1783, 1787, 1789, 1801, 1811, 1823, 1831, 1847, 1861, 1867, 1871, 1873, 1877, 1879, 1889, 1901, 1907, 1913, 1931, 1933, 1949, 1951, 1973, 1979, 1987, 1993, 1997, 1999

References 

 
Integers